Shap Long is a village located on Lantau Island, Hong Kong.

Administration
Shap Long is a recognized village under the New Territories Small House Policy.

History
In 1950, the Hong Kong Government and The Leprosy Mission decided to set up a leprosarium on nearby Hei Ling Chau. The inhabitants were given compensation to leave the island, and settled in nearby areas namely Tai Pak, Shap Long and Cheung Chau.

See also
 Chi Ma Wan
 Shap Long Reservoir

References

External links
 Delineation of area of existing village Shap Long (South Lantao) for election of resident representative (2019 to 2022)

Villages in Islands District, Hong Kong
Lantau Island